William Anthony Derlago (born August 25, 1958) is a Canadian former professional ice hockey player. He played in the National Hockey League from 1978 to 1987 with the Vancouver Canucks, Toronto Maple Leafs, Boston Bruins, Winnipeg Jets and Quebec Nordiques. Derlago was born in Birtle, Manitoba, but grew up in Beulah, Manitoba.

Career
Growing up, Derlago excelled at multiple sports, including golf, tennis, baseball, and hockey. He achieved best success with ice hockey, playing with the Brandon Wheat Kings and setting a number of WCJHL records. He was selected fourth overall by the Vancouver Canucks in the 1978 NHL Entry Draft.

As a rookie with the Canucks in 1978–79, Derlago badly injured his knee and was limited to just nine games, though he did score eight points. Though he played well in Vancouver, he was unable to live up to team expectations, and was traded to Toronto along with Rick Vaive for Tiger Williams and Jerry Butler on February 18, 1980.

In Toronto, Derlago, raised to a star status, worked particularly well with Vaive. Though successful on the ice, it was speculated that Derlago could have achieved more.

On October 11, 1985, Derlago was traded to the Boston Bruins for Tom Fergus. In Boston, he played as a defensive forward on the third and fourth line. After only 39 games in Boston he was again traded, this time to the Winnipeg Jets in exchange for Wade Campbell. In the later stages of his career Derlago was sent to the Quebec Nordiques in 1987. Finally, Derlago was relegated to the Fredericton Express of the American Hockey League. 
Derlago spent one additional season in Switzerland before announcing his retirement in 1988.

Derlago currently resides in Concord, Ontario, and operates a Chrysler dealership.

Career statistics

Awards and achievements 
1977: WCHL Scoring Champion
1977: WCHL First All-Star Team
1977: WCHL Goals Leader
1978: WCHL Goals Leader
1978: WCHL Second All-Star Team
"Honoured Member" of the Manitoba Hockey Hall of Fame

References

External links
 
 Profile at hockeydraftcentral.com

1958 births
Living people
Boston Bruins players
Brandon Travellers players
Brandon Wheat Kings players
Canadian ice hockey centres
Dallas Black Hawks players
Fredericton Express players
HC Ambrì-Piotta players
Ice hockey people from Manitoba
National Hockey League first-round draft picks
Quebec Nordiques players
Toronto Maple Leafs players
Vancouver Canucks draft picks
Vancouver Canucks players
Winnipeg Jets (1979–1996) players